The State Farm Missouri Valley Conference men's basketball tournament, commonly called Arch Madness, is an annual basketball tournament which features the men's basketball teams of each of the Missouri Valley Conference member universities.  The tournament, held in St. Louis since 1991, determines which MVC team receives an automatic bid to the NCAA Division I men's basketball tournament. Arch Madness celebrated its 30th Anniversary in 2020.

As of 2021, the tournament is the second longest running tournament (to the Big East men's basketball tournament) to be continuously held in one city. Although technically the BIG EAST did not conclude their 2020 tournament due to the COVID-19 pandemic the Valley has indicated it will not attempt to claim the longest running title due to the circumstances surrounding the pandemic.

Tournament champions by year

Team notes: West Texas State is now known as West Texas A&M (effective 1990); Missouri State was known as Southwest Missouri State until 2005.

Venue notes: Enterprise Center was known as Kiel Center (1994–2000), Savvis Center (2000–06), and Scottrade Center (2006–18).

Tournament championships by school

† Former conference member

Team notes: West Texas State is now known as West Texas A&M (effective 1990); Missouri State was known as Southwest Missouri State until 2005.

Postseason History Multiple Bids 

{|width="100%"
|-----
| valign="top" |

Broadcasters

Television

Radio

References

 
Basketball in St. Louis
Recurring sporting events established in 1977
College sports tournaments in Missouri